Mitch Malloy is the self-titled debut album by American singer-songwriter Mitch Malloy.  It featured 11 songs, all of which were co-written by Malloy himself and produced by engineer Sir Arthur Payson (according to Malloy, it was the first album Payson had produced on his own without his mentor, Desmond Child).

The record's first single, the hard-edged, up-tempo rocker "Anything at All" became a top-20 hit on the US rock charts, and was a hit on the Billboard Hot 100 reaching  #49 on June 13, 1992. It also had a rather popular music video, which was featured on MTV's Headbangers Ball. The album's second single, "Nobody Wins in This War" peaked at No. 66 on Billboards Top 100 with the third single, "Our Love Will Never Die," promoted on The Jay Leno Show.

Track listing

Personnel
Mitch Malloy: vocals, acoustic & electric guitars
Bekka Bramlett, Tommy Funderburk, Vinnie James, Devon Meade, Carole Rowley, Yvonne Williams: backing vocals
Tristan Avakian, Kevin Dukes, Michael Hart Thompson: lead & rhythm guitars
Jeffrey "C.J." Vanston, Jai Winding: keyboards
Hugh McDonald: bass
Mickey Curry: drums
Michael Fisher: percussion
Larry Williams: saxophone
Gary Grant, Jerry Hey: trumpets (horns arranged by Jerry Hey)

Production
Produced, engineered & mixed by Sir Arthur Payson
Assistant recording engineers: Lawrence Ethan, Greg Grill, Mike Hagen, Mike Piersante, Mike Scotella
Mastered by George Marino

References

RCA Records albums
1992 debut albums
Mitch Malloy albums